Daftendirektour was the first concert tour by the French electronic music duo Daft Punk. The tour spanned from February to December 1997.

Background
For this tour, Daft Punk used their home studio equipment for the live stage. As Thomas Bangalter of the duo stated, "Everything was synched up—the drum machines, the bass lines. The sequencer was just sending out the tempos and controlling the beats and bars. On top of this structure we built all these layers of samples and various parts that we could bring in whenever we wanted to." Little video footage from the tour has been released. A clip featuring "Rollin' & Scratchin'" can be seen on D.A.F.T.: A Story About Dogs, Androids, Firemen and Tomatoes. Elements of the track "Alive" can also be heard as it was performed at the Mayan Theater in Los Angeles, California. The band had used several machines running ARKAOS software into a custom visual setup.

Daft Punk released a live album, Alive 1997, in 2001, which featured their performance at Que Club Birmingham on 8 November 1997. The recording was selected by Daft Punk themselves for release, as they considered it to be their favorite from the Daftendirektour. In 2022, a recording of the complete Mayan Theater set from the tour was streamed to promote the rerelease of Homework and Alive 1997.

Setlist
Average setlist based on known performances from 14 June 1997, 9 August 1997, 8 November 1997, and 17 December 1997. Shows were improvised and the order and number of songs varied across the tour, although the setlist below was usually played (minus the encore).
"Musique"
"Short Circuit" (early version)
"Daftendirekt" / "Da Funk"
"Da Funk" (Armand van Helden's Ten Minutes of Funk mix)
"Rollin' & Scratchin'"
Unreleased
"Alive" / "Can You Feel It" (cover of CLS)
"Burnin'"
"Rock'n Roll" / "Oh Yeah"
"Around the World" / "The Chase" (cover of Giorgio Moroder)
"Teachers" / "You Can't Hide From Your Bud" (cover of DJ Sneak) (encore)
 
No official setlist has ever been published from this tour, and some misinformation has spread surrounding the setlist. In some publications for Alive 1997, the transition between "Short Circuit" and "Daftendirekt" is titled "WDPK (Part I)" and the unreleased song between "Rollin' & Scratchin'" and "Alive" has been titled by fans as an alternate live version of "Revolution 909" or as "WDPK (Part II)". At least once, "Fresh" and the album version of "Revolution 909" were performed live between "Musique" and "Short Circuit".

Tour dates

References 

1997 concert tours
Daft Punk